Victory Park is a master planned development northwest of downtown Dallas, Texas (USA) and north of Spur 366 (Woodall Rodgers Freeway).  It is along Interstate 35E, part of the Stemmons Corridor and Uptown.

History
Victory Park was developed by Ross Perot, Jr., son of billionaire tycoon Ross Perot, who was a majority owner of the Dallas Mavericks NBA basketball team. Perot envisioned Victory Park as an "urban lifestyle destination."  Anchored by the American Airlines Center, home of the Mavericks, the entire development was planned at a very detailed level by its developers.

The development has been criticized as being a "collection of imposing hyper-modern monumental structures, high-end chain stores, enormous video screens, expensive restaurants, a sports arena and tons of parking, completely isolated from the rest of the city by a pair of freeways . . . like the schizophrenic dream of some power-hungry capitalist technocrat." However, other journalists have countered this criticism of New Urbanist principles, citing that developments like Victory Park build on a classic, centuries old formula and "are not a quick fix but the slow weaving together of smart, sometimes big, often small, urban solutions" to create viable and enduring community destinations.

Tenants

Current Tenants

The American Airlines Center: Home of the Dallas Mavericks and Dallas Stars, was the first tenant located in Victory Park.  The facility opened in July 2001.

Plaza Towers : office towers bordering AT&T Plaza. In 2012, Cumulus Media relocated their local radio stations (KLIF (AM), KLIF-FM, KPLX, KSCS, KTCK AM/FM, and WBAP) here.

One Victory Park: A large office building across the street from the American Airlines Center and the W Hotel; houses the Dallas office of Big 4 accounting firm Ernst & Young, corporate headquarters for PlainsCapital Bank, and the Dallas offices of Haynes and Boone. Balducci's, a luxury gourmet grocer, Lucy Boutique and a Starbucks. This building features an environmentally friendly underfloor air system. Conditioned air for the occupants is provided by raised floor custom air handling units located in the tenant space that delivers 62 degree air into a raised access floor plenum. This underfloor air system provides users with the ability to control their own space temperature as well as improving the ventilation effectiveness. When building churn occurs, workstation moves can be performed easier with lower cost and less product waste.

Perot Museum of Nature and Science: Thom Mayne-designed museum dedicated to science, nature and the environment.

Former Tenants 
WFAA-TV, which had occupied a "window-on-the-world" studio in the Plaza Towers since 2007, left Victory Park in 2021 for an updated studio at the station's headquarters on Young Street.

Transportation

Commuter rail

Trinity Railway Express
Victory Station

Light rail

DART:  and 
Victory Station

Education

The district is zoned to schools in the Dallas Independent School District.

Residents of the neighborhood are zoned to Hope Medrano Elementary School, Thomas J. Rusk Middle School and North Dallas High School.

References

External links

Transit-oriented developments
Economy of Dallas